The Pineapple is a Grade II listed public house at 51 Leverton Street, Kentish Town, London.

It was built in about 1868.

Its resident cat was called Spongebob.

References

External links

Grade II listed buildings in the London Borough of Camden
Grade II listed pubs in London
Kentish Town
Pubs in the London Borough of Camden